Tony Locke (born May 19, 1978 in Springfield, Ohio) is an American football wide receiver/defensive back who played most recently for the New Orleans VooDoo in the Arena Football League. He played college football for the Ohio State Buckeyes where he was a two-year letterman.

Early years
Locke attended Urbana High School in Urbana, Ohio, where he stood out in football, basketball, and athletics. In football, he was a two-time All-Area selection and also was named the Team MVP as a senior.

Professional career
Lock has played in the AFL for the Columbus Destroyers (2004, 2007), the Los Angeles Avengers (2005–2006), and the New Orleans VooDoo (2007).

He started his professional career in the AFL2 with the Cincinnati Swarm, and also played for the Albany Conquest before going on to start his AFL career with the Columbus Destroyers.

He retired from the AFL after the 2007 season.

Film career
He recently appeared in the movie Invincible starring Mark Wahlberg as a football player along with WR/DB Kevin Ingram who played with Locke when he was with the Los Angeles Avengers.

External links
AFL stats

1978 births
Living people
Sportspeople from Springfield, Ohio
American football wide receivers
Ohio State Buckeyes football players
Columbus Destroyers players
Los Angeles Avengers players
New Orleans VooDoo players
Cincinnati Swarm players
Albany Conquest players